Leadcore Technology is a Chinese fabless semiconductor company that provides system-on-chip solutions for smartphones and tablets, specializing in the TD-SCDMA and TD-LTE network standards used in China and in other countries.

According to DigiTimes, in Q2 2014 Leadcore was the sixth-largest supplier of smartphone application processors in China with a market share of 3%  of all units, which represents unit shipments of about 3 million.

On May 26, 2017, Qualcomm (China) Holdings Co., Ltd., Beijing Jianguang Asset Management Co., Ltd., Leadcore Technology Co., Ltd. and Beijing Zhilu Asset Management Co., Ltd. jointly signed an agreement to establish a joint venture company - Lingsheng Technology (Guizhou) Ltd. (JLQ Technology). The joint venture will focus on the smartphone chipset business in China.

Product list

Smartphone/tablet processors 

The LC1810/1811 are an older generation platform supporting the Android 4.0 platform. For the camera interface, LC1810 has a 20M pixels ISP, the LC1811 an 8M pixels ISP.

The LC1813/1913 were released in 2013 and support Android 4.3. Both chips have a 13M pixels ISP. The LC1913 tablet processor has USB-OTG support as an extra feature.

The LC1860 and LC1960 with hexa-core CPU and LTE support were announced in 2014 and support Android 4.4. The LC1860 has a 20M pixels ISP. The LC1860C is a lower-end version of the LC1860 with quad-core CPU, lower GPU speed, single-channel memory interface and a 13M pixels ISP.

The company also offers feature phone processors, including the LC1712, manufactured at 55 nm, and the 65 nm L1808B.

See also 

 Allwinner Technology
 HiSilicon
 InfoTM
 MediaTek
 Nufront
 Qualcomm
 Rockchip
 Spreadtrum

References

External links 
 

Companies based in Shanghai
Chinese brands
Fabless semiconductor companies
System on a chip
Semiconductor companies of China